The IAAF Grand Prix II was an annual series of one-day track and field competitions organized by the International Association of Athletics Federations (IAAF). It was introduced in 1993 as an expansion of the IAAF Grand Prix series, adding a second category of competitions in order to support a greater number of meetings the financial benefit of being an official Grand Prix meeting. Prior to its creation, meetings not on the Grand Prix list were included as IAAF Permit Meetings. Further additions to the Grand Prix II level required a competition to have held permit status for two years. Over the competition's history, at least of 25 different meetings were part of the circuit.

Athletes earned points at the meetings, dependent upon their finishing position, and the overall points leaders from the wider circuit gained entry to the annual IAAF Grand Prix Final in 1993 to 2002, then the IAAF World Athletics Final from 2003 to 2005.

The role of the Grand Prix II category changed over the years, starting as the second tier of the IAAF Grand Prix before changing to the third tier with the introduction of the IAAF Golden League in 1998. The creation of the IAAF World Outdoor Meetings tour reorganised the IAAF's one-day circuit into four tiers, with the IAAF Super Grand Prix becoming the second most prestigious grouping and the IAAF Grand Prix II as the fourth and lowest level. The category was made defunct in 2006, when the IAAF World Athletics Tour was created.

Editions
The IAAF Grand Prix II calendar was subject to change during its lifetime, with the number of meetings, the constituent meetings, and the duration of the series all regularly changing from year to year.

Key:

Meetings

The South African meet was held in Johannesburg in 1996 and 1998 and Roodepoort in 1999
The 2003 Adidas Oregon Track Classic was held in Gresham, Oregon
The 2003 Brothers Znamensky Memorial was held in Tula, Russia

References 

 
Grand Prix II
Annual athletics series
Grand Prix II
Grand Prix II
Defunct athletics competitions
Recurring sporting events established in 1993
Recurring sporting events disestablished in 2005